The Fayette Sandstone is a geologic formation in Texas. It preserves fossils dating back to the Paleogene period.

See also

 List of fossiliferous stratigraphic units in Texas
 Paleontology in Texas

References
 

Limestone formations of the United States
Paleogene geology of Texas